The Davidson Wildcats basketball team is the basketball team that represents Davidson College in Davidson, North Carolina, in the NCAA. The school's team currently competes in the Atlantic 10 Conference. The team last played in the NCAA Division I men's basketball tournament in 2022. The Wildcats are currently coached by Matt McKillop, in his first season after succeeding his father Bob after the 2021–22 season. Davidson plays its home games at the Belk Arena in Baker Sports Complex on the school's campus.

Conference affiliations 
 1907–08 to 1935–36: Independent
 1936–37 to 1987–88: Southern Conference
 1988–89 to 1989–90: NCAA Division I independent
 1990–91 to 1991–92: Big South Conference
 1992–93 to 2013–14: Southern Conference
 2014–15 to present: Atlantic 10 Conference

Postseason

NCAA tournament results
The Wildcats have appeared in 15 NCAA Tournaments. Their combined record is 8–16.

2008 NCAA tournament
In 2008, Davidson defeated the Gonzaga Bulldogs, Georgetown Hoyas, and Wisconsin Badgers to advance to the Elite Eight. The Wildcats nearly made the Final Four, but lost to the eventual champion Kansas Jayhawks 57–59. Prior to their Sweet Sixteen matchup, the college's board of trustees supplied students with tickets, transportation and lodging for the Sweet Sixteen and Elite Eight games. Following the tournament, the Wildcats earned a number 9 ranking in the ESPN/USA Today poll. Stephen Curry, who has since become a two-time NBA MVP with the Golden State Warriors, was the leading scorer of this team.

NIT results
The Wildcats have appeared in nine National Invitation Tournaments. Their combined record is 3–9.

CBI results
The Wildcats have appeared in one College Basketball Invitational. Their record is 1–1.

ESPN basketball ranking
In a system ranked by ESPN, Davidson was listed as the #44 Basketball Program of the last 50 years (1962–2012) based on its on the court accomplishments during that period. (out of 309 Division I programs that qualified)

"Positives: Under Lefty Driesell, the Wildcats were a powerhouse in the 1960s, racking up seven 20-win seasons in an eight-year span. The ’64–65 team was AP preseason No. 4 and boasted future NBA No. 1 pick Fred Hetzel. Nine combined conference titles (Regular season & Conference Tournaments) since 2005."

Players

Retired numbers

Per athletic department policy, number and/or jersey retirement is reserved for players who have earned bachelor's degrees at Davidson. While six players have had jerseys retired, Stephen Curry is the first to have his number retired. Curry qualified after completing his bachelor's degree in May 2022. During the retirement ceremony held on August 31, 2022, Curry not only had his number retired, but also entered Davidson's athletic hall of fame and physically received his Davidson diploma.

Retired jerseys
Honored, but numbers are still active:

All-Americans

Wildcats in the NBA/ABA

Wildcats playing in international leagues

 Luka Brajkovic (born 1999), Austrian player for Rio Breogan of Liga ACB
 Jake Cohen (born 1990), American-Israeli player for Maccabi Tel Aviv and the Israeli national basketball team
 Jón Axel Guðmundsson (born 1996), Icelandic guard for Victoria Libertas Pesaro of the Italian Lega Basket Serie A

Players in Davidson Athletics Hall of Fame

John Belk ’43
Stephen Curry (played 2006–2009; inducted in 2022)
Fred Hetzel ’65
Rodney Knowles ’68
Derek Rucker ’88
Richard Snyder ’66
 John Gerdy ’79
Brandon Williams '96
Brendan Winters '06

G.F."Red" Laird three sports, about 1923 inducted this year

Coaches in Davidson Athletics Hall of Fame
Charles "Lefty" Driesell

References

External links